Danny Halliwell (born 23 March 1981) is a former professional rugby league footballer who played in the 2000s and 2010s.

Background
Danny Halliwell is the grandson of the rugby league  who played the 1960s, and 1970s for Swinton (also coach 1978–1979), Salford and Warrington (Heritage № 690); Ken Halliwell.

References

External links
 (archived by web.archive.org) Statistics at wolvesplayers.thisiswarrington.co.uk

1981 births
Living people
Barrow Raiders players
Blackpool Panthers players
English rugby league players
Halifax R.L.F.C. players
Keighley Cougars players
Leigh Leopards players
Oldham R.L.F.C. players
Oxford Cavaliers players
Place of birth missing (living people)
Rugby league centres
Rugby league second-rows
Rugby league wingers
Salford Red Devils players
Swinton Lions players
Wakefield Trinity players
Warrington Wolves players